The Armour Historic District encompasses a predominantly residential area of Armour, the county seat of Douglas County, South Dakota.  It covers a four-block stretch of Main Street, between Third and Seventh Streets and includes twenty primary buildings.  Only one of these, the Armour Carnegie Library, is non-residential; it was designed by William Steele and built in 1915.  Most of the houses in the district were built between 1895 and 1918, and are an architecturally diverse collection of largely vernacular structures, with modest Queen Anne and Colonial or Classical Revival elements.  One of the finest houses in the district is the William Moore House at Main and Fourth, built in 1904, with a porch supported by fluted columns.

The district was listed on the National Register of Historic Places in 1978.

See also
National Register of Historic Places listings in Douglas County, South Dakota

References

Historic districts on the National Register of Historic Places in South Dakota
Queen Anne architecture in South Dakota
Neoclassical architecture in South Dakota
Douglas County, South Dakota
National Register of Historic Places in Douglas County, South Dakota